Steven Marković (born 14 March 1985) is an Australian former professional basketball player.

Early life
Marković was born in the Sydney suburb of Liverpool to a Serbian father and an Italian mother.

Professional career
Marković was a development player with the West Sydney Razorbacks of the National Basketball League in 2002–03 and played in a total of five games. In 2003, he signed a full contract with the Razorbacks, going on to win the 2004 NBL Rookie of the Year award. In October 2005, he moved to Serbia, spending the next three seasons with Crvena zvezda. In July 2008, Marković signed with Benetton Treviso of Italy for the 2008–09 season, before being loaned back to Crvena zvezda in February 2009.

After missing the entire 2009–10 season due to injury, Marković signed with Radnički Kragujevac in September 2010. In early May 2013, Marković was released by Radnički after three seasons following altercations with team management.

On 31 May 2013, Marković signed a two-year deal with the Townsville Crocodiles.

On 30 June 2015, Marković signed with the Sydney Kings for the 2015–16 NBL season. On 6 January 2016, he was ruled out for the rest of the season with an illness. He managed just seven games for the Kings, with his final game coming on 19 November.

National team career
Marković played for Australia at the 2010 FIBA World Championship.

See also 
 List of KK Crvena zvezda players with 100 games played
 List of foreign basketball players in Serbia

References

External links
 Eurocupbasketball.com profile
 Legabasket.it profile
 NBL stats

1985 births
Living people
ABA League players
Australian expatriate basketball people in Italy
Australian expatriate basketball people in Serbia
Australian men's basketball players
Australian Institute of Sport basketball players
Australian people of Italian descent
Australian people of Serbian descent
Basketball League of Serbia players
Basketball players from Sydney
KK Crvena zvezda players
KK Radnički Kragujevac (2009–2014) players
Pallacanestro Treviso players
Point guards
Shooting guards
Sydney Kings players
Townsville Crocodiles players
West Sydney Razorbacks players
2010 FIBA World Championship players